Debasree Chaudhuri (born 31 January 1971) is an Indian politician who served as the Minister of State for Woman and Child Development in the Second Modi ministry in the Government of India. She was elected to the 17th Lok Sabha from Raiganj constituency in West Bengal in the 2019 Indian general election as a member of the Bharatiya Janata Party.

Early life
Chaudhuri was born in Balurghat to Debidas Chaudhuri and Ratna Chaudhuri. She completed her Master of Arts from the University of Burdwan.

Political career

On 16 December 2016, Chaudhuri was arrested along with Baisnabnagar MLA Swadhin Kumar Sarkar and other local BJP leaders at a protest condemning comments made by Maulauna Noor ur Rahman Barkati, the Shahi Imam of the Tipu Sultan Mosque in Kolkata. Debashree Chowdhury was previously the District Observer of BJP Kolkata South Suburban District till 2019.

In the 2019 Indian general election, Chaudhuri won from the Raiganj Lok Sabha constituency with 511652 votes. In May 2019, Chaudhuri became Minister of State for Women and Child Development.

References

External links
 Profile - Parliament of India

1971 births
People from Balurghat
India MPs 2019–present
Lok Sabha members from West Bengal
West Bengal politicians
Women in West Bengal politics
Women members of the Lok Sabha
Living people
Bharatiya Janata Party politicians from West Bengal
Narendra Modi ministry
21st-century Indian politicians
21st-century Indian women politicians